Nepenthes truncata (from Latin truncatus "terminating abruptly") is a tropical pitcher plant endemic to the Philippines. It is known from the islands of Dinagat, Leyte, and Mindanao. The species grows at an elevation of 0–1500 m above sea level. Nepenthes truncata is characterised by its heart-shaped (truncate) leaves and very large pitchers, which can reach up to 40 cm in height.

Nepenthes robcantleyi was once considered a dark, highland form of this species.

Carnivory
On September 29, 2006, at the Botanical Gardens in Lyon, France, a Nepenthes truncata was photographed containing the decomposing corpse of a mouse.  This incident is the first record of a mammal being successfully trapped in the pitchers of N. truncata indoors. Both N. rajah   and N. rafflesiana are known to occasionally catch small mammals in the wild.
Although it is possible for Nepenthes truncata to trap mice, the calcium heavy bones will not be digested.

Natural hybrids
N. alata × N. truncata [=N. × truncalata]
N. mindanaoensis × N. truncata
? N. petiolata × N. truncata

References

Carnivorous plant resource. 2019.

Further reading

 Bauer, U., C.J. Clemente, T. Renner & W. Federle 2012. Form follows function: morphological diversification and alternative trapping strategies in carnivorous Nepenthes pitcher plants. Journal of Evolutionary Biology 25(1): 90–102. 
 Cantley, R. 2000. Nepenthes of the Philippines. [video] The 3rd Conference of the International Carnivorous Plant Society, San Francisco, USA.
 Cheek, M. & M. Jebb 2014. Expansion of the Nepenthes alata group (Nepenthaceae), Philippines, and descriptions of three new species. Blumea 59: 144–154. 
 Clarke, C. & J.A. Moran 2011. Incorporating ecological context: a revised protocol for the preservation of Nepenthes pitcher plant specimens (Nepenthaceae). Blumea 56(3): 225–228. 
 Co, L. & W. Suarez 2012. Nepenthaceae. Co's Digital Flora of the Philippines.
 Elmer, A.D.E. 1915. Nepenthaceae. [pp. 2785–2787] In: Two hundred twenty six new species—II. Leaflets of Philippine Botany 8: 2719–2883.
  Gronemeyer, T. 2008. Nepenthes auf den Philippinen – Ein Reisebericht. Das Taublatt 60(1): 15–27.
 Kurup, R., A.J. Johnson, S. Sankar, A.A. Hussain, C.S. Kumar & S. Baby 2013. Fluorescent prey traps in carnivorous plants. Plant Biology 15(3): 611–615. 
 Macfarlane, J.M. 1927. The Philippine species of Nepenthes. The Philippine Journal of Science 33(2): 127–140.
  Mansur, M. 2001.  In: Prosiding Seminar Hari Cinta Puspa dan Satwa Nasional. Lembaga Ilmu Pengetahuan Indonesia, Bogor. pp. 244–253.
  McPherson, S. & T. Gronemeyer 2008. Die Nepenthesarten der Philippinen Eine Fotodokumentation. Das Taublatt 60(1): 34–78.
 Meimberg, H., A. Wistuba, P. Dittrich & G. Heubl 2001. Molecular phylogeny of Nepenthaceae based on cladistic analysis of plastid trnK intron sequence data. Plant Biology 3(2): 164–175. 
  Meimberg, H. 2002.  Ph.D. thesis, Ludwig Maximilian University of Munich, Munich.
 Meimberg, H. & G. Heubl 2006. Introduction of a nuclear marker for phylogenetic analysis of Nepenthaceae. Plant Biology 8(6): 831–840. 
 Meimberg, H., S. Thalhammer, A. Brachmann & G. Heubl 2006. Comparative analysis of a translocated copy of the trnK intron in carnivorous family Nepenthaceae. Molecular Phylogenetics and Evolution 39(2): 478–490. 
 Rasco, E.T. Jr. & M.A.D. Maquilan 2005. Initial studies on in vitro germination and early seedling growth of Nepenthes truncata Macf.. Carnivorous Plant Newsletter 34(2): 51–55.
 Rasco, E.T. Jr., G.K.R. Oguis & C.S.C. Silvosa 2012. In vitro rooting of Nepenthes truncata Macf.. Carnivorous Plant Newsletter 41(4): 135–139.
 Renner, T. & C.D. Specht 2011. A sticky situation: assessing adaptations for plant carnivory in the Caryophyllales by means of stochastic character mapping. International Journal of Plant Sciences 172(7): 889–901. 
 Siegara, A. & Yogiara 2009. Bacterial community profiles in the fluid of four pitcher plant species (Nepenthes spp.) grown in a nursery. Microbiology Indonesia 3(3): 109–114.
 Silvosa, C.S.C., E.T. Rasco Jr. & M.A.D. Maquilan 2013. Agricultural waste materials as component of organic potting media for the endangered Nepenthes truncata Macf. (Philippine pitcher plant). Carnivorous Plant Newsletter 42(2): 47–56.
  Svítek, M. 2002. Portréty rostlin - Nepenthes truncata (Macf.) syn. Nepenthes megamphora (Merr. & Quis). Trifid 2002(1): 37–39. (page 2, page 3)
 Exploration of Mount Anipahan and Mount Kiamo. [video] Redfern Natural History Productions.
 WGAL News: Carnivorous Plant Eats Mouse at French Garden

Carnivorous plants of Asia
truncata
Endemic flora of the Philippines
Flora of Mindanao
Flora of the Visayas
Endangered flora of Asia
Plants described in 1911